Uma Bhende (1945 – 19 July 2017) was an Indian actress who worked in Marathi films, television and theatre. She made her debut in Marathi film Aakshganga (1960). She is known for appearing in movies Aamhi Jato Amchya Gava (1968), Angai (1968), Bhalu (1980). Bhende was felicitated by Chitrabhushan Award for her contribution towards Marathi film industry.

Filmography

Films
 Aakashganga (1960)
 Antaricha Diva (1960)
 Swayamvar Zale Siteche  (1964)
 Malhari Martand  (1965)
 Shevatcha Malusara (1966)
 Madhuchandra  (1967)
 Kaka Mala Vachava (1967)
 Angai  (1968)
 Aamhi Jato Amuchya Gava  (1968)
 Naate Jadale Don Jivanche  (1971)
 Ti Pach Najuk Bote (1972)
 Ashi Hi Sataryachi Tarha (1974)
 Bhalu  (1980)
 Chatak Chandni (1982)
 Thoratanchi Kamla (1984)
 Premasathi Vattel Te (1987)
 Apan Yana Pahilat ka (1992)
 Aai Thor Tuze Upkar (2001)

See also
Marathi cinema

References 

1945 births
2017 deaths
Marathi actors
Actresses in Marathi cinema
Actresses from Mumbai
20th-century Indian actresses
Indian film actresses
Indian stage actresses